Baao, officially the Municipality of Baao (Rinconada Bikol: Banwāan ka Baao; Tagalog: Bayan ng Baao) is 1st class municipality in the province of Camarines Sur, Philippines. According to the 2020 census, it has a population of 61,493 people.

The municipality of Baao is within the 5th Congressional District of the province of Camarines Sur. The town is bounded on the north by the municipalities of Pili and Ocampo, on the east by the city of Iriga, on the west by Bula, and south by the municipality Nabua.

Geography

Barangays
Baao is politically subdivided into 30 barangays.

Climate

Demographics

As of 2020 50,419 or 82% of people lived in urban areas while the remaining 11,074
18% people live in rural areas.

Language 

Rinconada Bikol is the main language of the population. Baaoeños used the Baao variant, a lowland dialect (sinaranəw) of Rinconada Bikol which is different of that in Iriga.

Tagalog and English are also spoken in formal gatherings and occasions. The latter is widely used in schools as well as in business transactions.

Religion 

As one of the historical towns of Catholicism in the Bicol region, Baao has a majority of Roman Catholic adherents. Iglesia ni Cristo on the other hand is the second largest group. Islam has already set off in the town and they are composed of Muslim merchants/immigrants from Mindanao. Various Protestant religious sects are also present.

Economy

Transportation
Accessible only by land transportation, it is along the main route of the Maharlika Highway and the Philippine National Railways. Commuter rail services are provided by PNR serving from Naga City as its terminus and stops at Baao Station up to Ligao City in Albay then back again northward to Naga. Yet rail service to Manila is currently suspended due severe damages brought by Typhoon Reming in 2006. However, this is overtaken by bus companies that serve daily intercity trips. From Naga City, the easiest way to go to Baao is to ride a bus going to Iriga City from the Naga City Central Bus Terminal and disembark at Baao bus stop.

Culture

Baao Today
Today, the town of Baao is hailed being the egg capital of the Bicol Region. The Poultry business  in Baao started by a man named Gregorio I. Gaite. He was originally from the town of Buhi, Camarines Sur but he spent most of his life at Baao. For his love in the Agricultura, he built the Baao Poultry Farm, it was the biggest supplier of eggs during the late 70's and 80's in Bicol and his younger brother, Melquiades I. Gaite owned the Lendes Poultry Farm. Gregorio has died on March 3, 2007, of prostate cancer.
 
IBOTO LANG ANG MATINO!!! DAE ANG KURAKOT!

Fiestas and festivals
The town fiesta (Feast of St. Bartolomew) or "Pintakasi" of Baao is celebrated from August 23 to 25. The only festival at Baao is the Barlin Festival; it commemorates the birthday of the First Filipino Bishop, Jorge I. Barlin. It is celebrated annually during the month of April.

Education

 
Baao Community College the lone state school offering tertiary courses for college students.

La Consolacion College Baao (formerly, the Sta. Monica Academy) is a private catholic school run by Augustinian sisters. It offers both elementary and secondary quality education with the purpose of creating graduates not only of high caliber but also with hearts that are "in one" with the poor.

Rosary School Inc. (formerly, the Rosary Learning Center) is a private educational institution offering complete preschool, elementary and secondary courses.

Ave Maria Early Childhood Impressions Center is a private catholic school for toddlers and pre-schoolers ages 2 yrs. old and above.

Other schools include:
 Agdangan High School
 Baao Central School
 Baao High School
 Baao West Central School
 Eusebia Paz Arroyo Memorial High School
 Nonito Paz Arroyo Memorial High School

Notable people

 Jorge Barlin y Imperial (1850-1909), First native Filipino bishop.
 Fr. Joaquin G. Bernas, S.J., J.S.D. Lawyer, Jesuit priest, constitutional law scholar, writer and newspaper columnist.
Luis Dato, writer, poet and educator
Rodolfo Dato, Dean of the University of Nueva Caceres
 Joker P. Arroyo, Filipino lawyer, politician and Senator of the Republic of the Philippines.
 Beatriz Saw, Pinoy Big Brother Season 2 Big Winner, actress

References

External links

 [ Philippine Standard Geographic Code]
Philippine Census Information

Municipalities of Camarines Sur